Francisco is a given name.

Francisco may also refer to:

 Francisco, Indiana, US, a town
 Francisco (CTA station), a railway station in Chicago, Illinois, US
 Francisco (moon), a satellite of Uranus
 Francisco (slave) (died 1876), the last person executed by Brazil
 Typhoon Francisco

See also 

 France (disambiguation)
 Frances (disambiguation)
 Francesco
 Francis (disambiguation)
 San Francisco (disambiguation)
 São Francisco (disambiguation)